Telecinco is a Spanish free-to-air television channel operated by Mediaset España. The channel was previously known as Tele 5, because it had first begun its experimental transmissions on 10 March 1989, and a year later, it was officially launched on 3 March, 1990, becoming the fifth of the national terrestrial television channels and the second private channel in Spain. In 1997, Tele 5 was rebranded as Telecinco, dropping the biscione-absent flower logo seen in other Mediaset channel logos.

History
On April 4, 1986, the Council of Ministers of Spain approved private television in the country, the legislation was approved in 1988. On August 25, 1989, the contest was held to obtain three private television licenses, which were granted to Gestevisión Telecinco, Grupo Antena 3 and Sogecable.

Tele 5 began transmissions experimentally in 1989 to officially begin broadcasting on March 3, 1990, although with limited coverage in Madrid and Barcelona. In January 1991, it achieved national coverage by starting broadcasts in the Canary Islands.

From its foundation until 1994, Tele 5 was directed by Valeriu Lazarov. during this period, a television channel similar to the Italian Canale 5 was made, highlighting a programming based mainly on entertainment programs such as contests, varieties, and humor, in addition to some series and movies, leaving the newscasts as 15-minute programs that were broadcast at dawn, with this formula the channel achieved its first audience successes.

In 1994, Maurizio Carlotti was appointed as the new director of the network, this with the aim of improving the financial and programming situation due to the fact that the channel had lost audience and advertisers in favor of Antena 3. Carlotti opted for an increase in the production of series and program formats that had not been broadcast in Spain, such as late shows. In 1997, the channel was reformed so that the identity associated with Canale 5 was abandoned and the production of informative programs was increased. It was also at this time the channel re-branded from Tele 5 to Telecinco.

In 1999, Carlotti became the vice president of Telecinco and acted as CEO of Mediaset, so the direction of the channel passed to Paolo Vasile, who ran the channel from that year until October 2022. With the arrival of the new millennium, Telecinco began its commitment to reality shows and sporting events. In 2004 the channel began trading on the Madrid Stock Exchange and that same year, it snatched the audience leadership from La 1. During this period, the channel began to be accused of generating trash TV due to the proliferation of spaces dedicated to gossip and related entertainment, which have been present on the network since its creation.

On November 30, 2005, Telecinco launched Telecinco Estrellas and Telecinco Sport, the network's thematic channels dedicated to the consolidation of the brand in Spanish digital terrestrial television, which was released on the same day. On September 20, 2010, Telecinco began transmissions in HD.

In 2009 Mediaset and PRISA TV began the procedures for the merger of the open television divisions of both companies, finally the agreement became effective on January 1, 2011, the new company resulting from the process was renamed Mediaset España Comunicación.

After the merger, Telecinco came to control eight channels: Cuatro; LaSiete; Factoría de Ficción; Divinity; Boing; Energy and Nueve, so part of its programming was allocated to the grids of the rest of the group's channels. In May 2014, LaSiete and Nueve were closed due to a court order. In 2016 Telecinco launched Be Mad.

In 2017, the channel was involved in a scandal due to an alleged sexual abuse that occurred during Gran Hermano, the local version of Big Brother. The crisis resulted in the abandonment of some advertisers due to the network's handling of the crisis, which was accused of acting late, exposing the victim to reliving the situation and trying to silence the information related to the act.

Programming 

In 2014, Telecinco was the most viewed channel in Spain with a share of 14.5%.
Telecinco is a general channel catering to all audiences. It shows popular films, series, and entertainment shows.

The channel's programming includes such series as La que se avecina, Sin tetas no hay paraíso, and Aída, as well as the entertainment shows Crónicas marcianas and Hay una cosa que te quiero decir and the talent show The Voice.

The channel is also known for its reality shows, having produced a number of popular series in the last decade – Gran Hermano, Supervivientes, Hotel Glam, and Operación Triunfo, amongst others. Reality shows feed many of the channel's other programmes such as the morning show El Programa de Ana Rosa, the afternoon show Sálvame and the weekly discussion show Sálvame Deluxe. All of these programmes experienced a substantial ratings boost thanks to the Reality Effect.

Production 
Telecinco has digitalised their production facilities. It allowed them to broadcast their channels in up to Spanish and original language, stereo sound, interactive services and high-definition television.

See also 
 Mediaset
 Canale 5

References

External links 

 Official website 

 
Channels of Mediaset España Comunicación
Television stations in Spain
Television stations in the Community of Madrid
Mass media in Madrid
Spanish-language television stations
Television channels and stations established in 1989
Television channels and stations established in 1990
1989 establishments in Spain
1990 establishments in Spain